The Qualifying Round of the 2013 World Baseball Classic was held from September 19 to November 19, 2012. Although the 2006 and 2009 editions of the World Baseball Classic were contested by the same pre-selected field of 16 teams, for the 2013 tournament only the 12 teams that won at least one game in 2009 were guaranteed a berth in the main tournament. The other four (Canada, Chinese Taipei, Panama, and South Africa) contested the qualifying round along with 12 additional teams invited by the International Baseball Federation (IBAF).

The qualifiers were organized as four independent modified double-elimination tournaments featuring four teams each. The final game was winner-take-all, even if won by the team emerging from the loser's bracket. That is, the team emerging from the winner's bracket might be eliminated despite losing only one game (as, in fact, happened to Israel in Qualifier 1).

Canada and Chinese Taipei dominated in Qualifiers 2 and 4 to advance easily. In Qualifier 1, Spain and Israel both won in the first round, then Israel beat Spain in the winner's bracket.  Spain then eliminated South Africa (the only team in the qualifier to have previously contested the WBC) to earn a rematch with Israel, which was without its several Major League players due to the qualifier taking place during the MLB season.  Spain won the winner-take-all final game, 9–7 in 10 innings, to advance to the main tournament.

In Qualifier 3, favorites Panama and Nicaragua lost in the first round, and Panama then eliminated Nicaragua. After both teams defeated Colombia, underdog Brazil defeated Panama 1–0 to advance to the main tournament.

Players

Under the Classic's rules, Team Israel was entitled to have non-Israeli citizens of Jewish heritage play for the team. Such players included major leaguers catcher Ryan Lavarnway, first baseman Ike Davis, second basemen Ian Kinsler and Josh Satin, third basemen Kevin Youkilis and Danny Valencia, outfielders Ryan Braun (whose father is Israeli), Sam Fuld, Ryan Kalish, and Gabe Kapler, and pitchers Jason Marquis, Scott Feldman, Craig Breslow, and John Grabow, as well as what were then recent major leaguers catcher Brad Ausmus and pitcher Scott Schoeneweis. Kinsler said: "Wow, I would be happy to play for Team Israel.... The truth is that if a proposal comes from Team USA to play for them, I will have a very difficult decision to make. Yuk [Kevin Youkilis], Braun [Ryan Braun], and I could make a fantastic team. I am sure that I'll talk it over with Yuk – we always laugh about things like this." Outfielder Shawn Green, who retired in 2007, was also eligible because he is Jewish. In early June 2011 he said it "would be an honor" and he "would love to" play for Israel in the Classic.

Because they were held in September, while the Major League Baseball season was still in progress, Qualifiers 1 and 2 could not feature major league players. Kevin Youkilis announced that he would play for the team if they made it past the qualifying round.

The highest-level players involved in Qualifiers 1 and 2 were minor-league prospects ranked among the top 20 in their respective organizations.  Team Israel, managed by former major league All Star Brad Ausmus, included minor league pitchers Eric Berger (1–0) and Brett Lorin, first baseman Nate Freiman (.417; 4 HR in 12 AB), second baseman Josh Satin (.273), shortstops Jake Lemmerman and Ben Orloff, and outfielders Adam Greenberg, Ben Guez, Joc Pederson (.308), and Robbie Widlansky. Retired major leaguer Shawn Green played for Israel (.333).

Similarly, Joey Votto and Justin Morneau were unable to play for Canada.  They were led by minor league first baseman Jimmy Van Ostrand (.538; 10 RBIs in 13 at-bats).  Although Canada advanced easily despite the unavailability of its Major Leaguers, Israel was eliminated after narrowly losing the final game to Spain.

By contrast, all four teams in Qualifier 3 boasted Major League players, as it took place in November and did not conflict with the MLB season.  Established Major Leaguers included Carlos Ruiz, Rubén Tejada, Manny Acosta, Manny Corpas, and Carlos Lee of Panama; and Everth Cabrera and J. C. Ramírez of Nicaragua.  Major League rookies and prospects included Erasmo Ramírez and Cheslor Cuthbert of Nicaragua; Yan Gomes of Brazil; and Luis Martinez and brothers Donavan and Jhonatan Solano of Colombia.  Retired Major Leaguers included Ramiro Mendoza of Panama and Édgar Rentería of Colombia.

Although Qualifier 4 also took place in November, it did not feature any current MLB players, as both Wei-Yin Chen and Chien-Ming Wang of Chinese Taipei elected to skip the qualifier.  Chinese Taipei did feature Japanese major leaguer Yao-Hsun Yang as well as Taiwanese league players such as Peng Cheng-min and Lin Chih-sheng, and qualified easily.  Both New Zealand and the Philippines included minor league players, while Thailand included former Major Leaguer Johnny Damon.

Venues
Four stadiums were used during the qualifying round:

Pools composition
Note: Numbers in parentheses indicate positions in the WBSC World Rankings at the time of the tournament.

Qualifying round

Qualifier 1

|}

Qualifier 2

|}

Qualifier 3

|}

Qualifier 4

|}

Attendance
103,774 (avg. 4,324; pct. 30.7%)
Qualifier 1 – 9,938 (avg. 1,656; pct. 24.1%)
Qualifier 2 – 17,186 (avg. 2,864; pct. 28.6%)
Qualifier 3 – 45,194 (avg. 7,532; pct. 27.9%)
Qualifier 4 – 31,456 (avg. 5,243; pct. 41.9%)

Statistics leaders

Batting

* Minimum 2.7 plate appearances per game

Pitching

* Minimum 0.8 innings pitched per game
** Mendoza is tied with 27 others with a 0.00 ERA but he pitched the most innings with 8.2

Additional rules
A pitcher threw no more than 85 pitches per game in the Qualifying Round unless the pitcher needed more to complete a batter's plate appearance.

A pitcher must:
 Not pitch until a minimum of four days have passed since he last pitched, if he threw 50 or more pitches when he last pitched;
 Not pitch until a minimum of one day has passed since he last pitched, if he threw 30 or more pitches when he last pitched;
 Not pitch until a minimum of one day has passed since any second consecutive day on which the pitcher pitched;

A mercy rule came into effect when one team led by either fifteen runs after five innings, or ten runs after seven innings.

An alternative version of the IBAF's extra inning rule was also used. If after 12 innings the score was still tied, each half inning thereafter would have started with runners on second and first base. The runners would have been the eighth and ninth hitters due in that inning respectively. For example, if the number five hitter was due to lead off the inning, the number three hitter would have been on second base, and the number four hitter on first base. However, this rule was never actually employed in this year's qualifiers, as the two extra-inning games in the qualifying round ended prior to a 13th inning.

References

External links
Official website

 
World Baseball Classic